Medhalsen Saddle is an ice saddle just south of Risemedet Mountain in the Gjelsvik Mountains of Queen Maud Land, Antarctica. It was mapped by Norwegian cartographers from surveys and air photos by the Sixth Norwegian Antarctic Expedition (1956–60) and named "Medhalsen" (the landmark neck).

References

External links

Mountain passes of Queen Maud Land
Princess Martha Coast